The Port Elizabeth Harbour 0-4-0ST of 1894 was a South African steam locomotive from the pre-Union era in the Cape of Good Hope.

Between 1894 and 1902, eight  locomotives entered shunting service at the Port Elizabeth Harbour. They were taken onto the Cape Government Railways roster in 1908 and all of them were still in service when the South African Railways classification and renumbering was implemented in 1912.

Manufacturers
In 1894 and 1895, four  locomotives were delivered to the Port Elizabeth Harbour Board (PEHB) from Black, Hawthorn & Company. They were numbered in the range from 1 to 4 and placed in service as harbour shunters at Port Elizabeth Harbour. By 1901, their numbers 1 to 4 had been replaced by the letters D to G.

During 1896, the firm of Black, Hawthorn was taken over by Chapman and Furneaux, who delivered another two of these locomotives in 1901. Instead of being numbered, these were lettered K and L.

The firm of Chapman and Furneaux closed down in 1902. Two locomotives which had been ordered from them in February 1902, order numbers 1213 and 1214, were built instead by Hudswell, Clarke & Company, ex works in July 1902 with works numbers 616 and 617. These two were lettered M and N.

Service

Kowie Railway
In 1904, one of these locomotives, ex no. 4/G, was sent to Port Alfred on loan to the Kowie Railway Company, who used it as yard engine in Port Alfred station. While there, the name plates from the then recently withdrawn  broad gauge engine Aid of 1878 were affixed to the saddle-tank of no. 4, and it became the engine Aid reincarnated. Many people erroneously believed that it was one-and-the-same locomotive, to the extent that it later became accepted as fact. The locomotive was returned to Port Elizabeth in 1910.

Cape Government Railways
In terms of Act 38 of 1908, the Cape Government Railways (CGR) became responsible for the administration of the three major harbours in the Cape of Good Hope with effect from 1 January 1909. The locomotives were therefore all taken onto the CGR roster and renumbered in the range from 1015 to 1022.

South African Railways
When the Union of South Africa was established on 31 May 1910, the three Colonial government railways (CGR, Natal Government Railways and Central South African Railways) were united under a single administration to control and administer the railways, ports and harbours of the Union. Although the South African Railways and Harbours came into existence in 1910, the actual classification and renumbering of all the rolling stock of the three constituent railways was only implemented with effect from 1 January 1912.

In 1912, these locomotives were considered obsolete by the South African Railways (SAR) and renumbered by having the numeral "0" prefixed to their existing numbers.

In June 1914, SAR no. 01017 was transferred to Mosselbaai Harbour. The rest remained in service in Port Elizabeth Harbour.

Rhodesia Railways
In July 1929, SAR no. 01021 was sold to Rhodesia Railways (RR), where it was given RR number 5. The locomotive never actually left South Africa, since it was purchased for use as shop engine at the RR's Mafeking Workshop, staffed by SAR personnel. The engine was eventually scrapped in 1940.

Locomotives no. 1012 to 1014
In the classification and renumbering lists of the SAR, published in 1912, three additional  locomotives of uncertain origin are listed as Port Elizabeth Harbour locomotives. Two of them are listed as CGR numbers 1012 and 1013, built by Peckett and Sons, while the third is listed as CGR no. 1014, built by Lowca Engineering Company. Also considered obsolete by the SAR, they were also renumbered with a numeral "0" prefixed to their CGR numbers.

These locomotives are shown here solely for the sake of completeness and because their PEHB letters and CGR and SAR numbers immediately precede those of the eight locomotives which are the subject of this article. It has since been discovered that the builder's details about the first two of these locomotives in the Rolling Stock Register was incorrect, possibly as a result of the locomotives getting equipped with replacement parts, such as new boilers bearing the markings of a manufacturer other than the original locomotive builder.

 The first locomotive, PEHB A, then CGR no. 1012, then SAR no. 01012, was built by Fox, Walker and Company, a predecessor of Peckett and Sons, as a Class W , ex-works in December 1876 and landed in Port Elizabeth in April 1877. Its erroneous description as a Peckett locomotive could possibly be as a result of the Peckett name appearing on replaced parts on the locomotive.

 How the first two locomotives both came to be described as Peckett locomotives in the 1912 renumbering lists is not known, since no records have been found of another Fox, Walker or Peckett locomotive which could have ended up on the Port Elizabeth Harbour Board roster. The second locomotive, PEHB B, then CGR no. 1013, then SAR no. 01013, was more likely to be a 0-4-0ST engine that was originally delivered to the Despatch Brickmaking & Woolwashing Company in Port Elizabeth, built in 1881 by Andrew Barclay Sons & Co. The Port Elizabeth Harbour Board Report for 1903 refers to the purchase of a small tank locomotive from the Despatch Brick Works. Since Andrew Barclay occasionally employed Ogee shaped tanks and since no other tank locomotives of this shape ever came to South Africa, it can be safely assumed that the engine depicted is the Despatch engine.
 The third locomotive, PEHB C, then CGR no. 1014, then SAR no. 01014, is believed to be Lowca Engineering's works no. 232 of 1898, which initially went to the Table Bay Harbour Board (TBHB), where it is believed to have been the TBHB's second no. 3 which was probably transferred to Port Elizabeth before 1901.

Works numbers
The builders, works numbers, order dates, original numbers and letterings, renumbering and disposition of the Port Elizabeth Harbour Board  locomotives of 1894 are listed in the table. The Fox, Walker and Lowca locomotives are included in the table.

References

0840
0-4-0ST locomotives
B locomotives
Steam locomotives of Rhodesia
Black, Hawthorn locomotives
Chapman & Furneaux locomotives
Hudswell Clarke locomotives
Fox, Walker locomotives
Lowca Engineering locomotives
Cape gauge railway locomotives
Railway locomotives introduced in 1894
1894 in South Africa
Scrapped locomotives